Stephanie Peay (born 1959) is a British ecologist and crayfish researcher.

Life and work
Peay studied at the University of Edinburgh and the University of Hull, and in 2014 was awarded a PhD by the University of Leeds. She is a member of the Institute of Ecology and Environmental Management and a Chartered Environmentalist.

In her early professional career, in 1984, she compiled the first draft of the ancient woodland inventory for West Sussex.

After working for the Farming and Wildlife Advisory Group she worked for Cobham Resource Consultants, later part of the Scott Wilson Group, as an ecological consultant, where her interests in the white clawed crayfish, Austropotamobius pallipes and signal crayfish, Pacifastacus leniusculus began.

As an independent crayfish researcher her research has concentrated on the protection of the UK native white clawed crayfish and restricting the invasion of the alien signal crayfish.

Peay is a leading proponent of crayfish conservation and management in Britain and has produced much of the guidance on crayfish used by British ecologists and managers on survey and monitoring methods, restoration of habitat, mitigation during works on waterbodies, and, latterly, on "ark sites" to safeguard white-clawed crayfish. She also provides advice and training for organisations such as the Wildlife Trusts, Environment Agency, Scottish Natural Heritage, BBC and others.

As invading signal crayfish are a major threat to native crayfish, both in Britain and in Europe, Peay has studied the effects of signal crayfish on white clawed crayfish and their environment, particularly on native fish stocks, and has researched control and eradication methods.

She represents The Wildlife Trusts on the UK Biodiversity Action Plan Steering Group for white clawed crayfish, is a board member of the International Association of Astacology and has contributed to the European CRAYNET programme.

In her employment as Associate Director, Ecology with Aecom, Peay has considerable experience of ecological surveys, ecological assessment and management in a range of habitats in the UK on many types of projects, notably in water resources development roads and airports.

She is a visiting lecturer at the University of Leeds.

References

1959 births
Living people
British ecologists
Women ecologists
Alumni of the University of Edinburgh
Alumni of the University of Hull
Academics of the University of Leeds
Place of birth missing (living people)